The Gerry Mulligan Quartet is an album recorded by American jazz saxophonist and bandleader Gerry Mulligan featuring performances recorded in 1962 (with one track from a live recording at the Village Vanguard) which were released on the Verve label.

Reception

Allmusic awarded the album 4 stars stating "The interplay between Mulligan and Brookmeyer rekindles the magic of their work together a half dozen years earlier".

Track listing
All compositions by Gerry Mulligan except as indicated
 "I'm Getting Sentimental Over You" (George Bassman, Ned Washington) - 5:01
 "Piano Train" - 6:07
 "Lost in the Stars" (Kurt Weill, Maxwell Anderson) - 5:33 	
 "I Believe in You" (Frank Loesser) - 4:36
 "Love in New Orleans" - 5:43
 "I Know, Don't Know How" - 7:50
Recorded at the Village Vanguard on February 25, 1962 (track 6) and Nola Penthouse Studio, NYC on May 14 & 15, 1962 (tracks 1-5)

Personnel
Gerry Mulligan - baritone saxophone
Bob Brookmeyer - valve trombone, piano track 2
Bill Crow - bass
Gus Johnson - drums

References

Gerry Mulligan albums
1962 albums
Verve Records albums
Albums recorded at the Village Vanguard